3 is a 2012 Uruguayan comedy-drama film directed by Pablo Stoll. The film was screened in the Directors' Fortnight section at the 2012 Cannes Film Festival.

Cast
Humberto de Vargas as Rodolfo
Sara Bessio as Graciela 
Anaclara Ferreyra Palfy as Ana 
Inés Bortagaray as the adjunct teacher
Néstor Guzzini as Dustin
Santiago Pedrero as Víctor
Matías Ganz as Matías
Carolina Centurión as Mica
Fabián Arenillas as a physician

References

External links

2012 films
2012 comedy-drama films
Uruguayan comedy-drama films
2010s Spanish-language films
Films directed by Pablo Stoll
Films set in Montevideo
Films shot in Uruguay